The Meyer Children Hospital is a pediatric hospital located in Florence, Italy.

The hospital is an official member of the European Network of Health Promoting Hospitals of the World Health Organization and the personnel are involved in prevention and health promotion programs for the Regional and National Health Departments.

References

External links
 Meyer Pediatric Hospital website 
 https://www.esmo.org/for-patients/esmo-designated-centres-of-integrated-oncology-palliative-care/esmo-accredited-designated-centres/anna-meyer-children-s-university-hospital-department-of-hematology-and-oncology

Hospitals established in 1884
Education in Florence
Anshen and Allen buildings
Hospitals in Florence
Children's hospitals in Italy